Adolf II may refer to:

 Adolf II of Lotharingia (1002–1041)
 Adolf II of Berg (died 1090/1106)
 Adolf II of Holstein (ca. 1128 – 1164)
 Adolf II of Waldeck (ca. 1250 – 1302)
 Adolf II of the Marck (died 1347)
 Adolf II von Nassau (ca. 1423 – 1475)
 Adolf II, Duke of Guelders (1438–1477)
 Adolf II, Prince of Schaumburg-Lippe (1883–1936)